Ryan Finley (born December 26, 1994) is an American football quarterback who is a free agent. He played college football at Boise State and NC State and was drafted by the Cincinnati Bengals in the fourth round of the 2019 NFL Draft.

Early years
Finley attended Paradise Valley High School in Phoenix, Arizona. As a senior he passed for 3,442 yards with 35 touchdowns. He committed to Boise State University to play college football.

College career
After redshirting his first year at Boise State in 2013, Finley played in five games in 2014, completing 12 of 27 passes for 161 yards with two touchdowns and an interception. He was named the starting quarterback for Boise State his redshirt sophomore year in 2015. He played in three games before suffering a season-ending ankle injury. In the three games, Finley completed 46 of 70 passes for 455 yards, one touchdown, and four interceptions.

After the season he transferred to NC State University. In his first season at NC State, he completed 243 of 402 passes (60.4%) for 3,059 yards, 18 touchdowns and eight interceptions.

In Finley's redshirt junior year, he completed 312 of 479 passes (65.1%) for 3,518 yards, 17 touchdowns, and 6 interceptions. He also rushed 69 times for 194 yards and 3 touchdowns and caught 2 passes for 18 yards. He was also named to the Academic All-ACC team for earning a 3.889 GPA.

College statistics

Professional career

Cincinnati Bengals
Finley was drafted by the Cincinnati Bengals in the fourth round (104th overall) of the 2019 NFL Draft. After opening the season as the backup quarterback to Andy Dalton, Finley was named the starter on October 29, 2019. Finley made his first start in Week 10 against the Baltimore Ravens. In the game, Finley threw for 167 yards, one touchdown, and one interception in the 13–49 loss. 
In week 12 against the Pittsburgh Steelers, Finley threw for 192 yards and a touchdown and lost two fumbles in the 10–16 loss. On the next day, Finley was benched for Dalton after going 0–3 in his three starts.

On November 22, 2020 against the Washington Football Team, Finley came into the game in the third quarter after starter Joe Burrow left the game with a left leg injury. Finley completed 3 of 10 passes for 30 yards, an interception, and a 0.0 passer rating as the Bengals lost 9–20. The following week, Bengals coach Zac Taylor named Brandon Allen the starting quarterback over Finley. Finley was named the starter for the Week 15 matchup against the Pittsburgh Steelers. Finley passed for 89 yards and a touchdown, and had 47 yards rushing, including a 23 yard rushing touchdown during the 27–17 win against the heavily favored Steelers, marking Finley's first win as an NFL quarterback.

Houston Texans
On March 19, 2021, the Bengals traded Finley and a seventh-round pick to the Houston Texans for a sixth-round pick. He was waived on May 24, 2021.

NFL career statistics

Personal life
Finley was born and raised in Phoenix, Arizona. Both of his parents were college athletes at St. Olaf College; his mother, Robin, played women's tennis, and his father, Pat, played football. His younger brother, Ben, is also currently a quarterback for the NC State Wolfpack.

References

External links
  Sports Reference (college)
Cincinnati Bengals bio
NC State Wolfpack bio
Boise State Broncos bio

1994 births
Living people
Players of American football from Phoenix, Arizona
American football quarterbacks
Boise State Broncos football players
NC State Wolfpack football players
Cincinnati Bengals players
Houston Texans players